The 1896 Manitoba general election was held on January 15, 1896. Thomas Greenway's Liberals won.

References

1892
1896 elections in Canada
1896 in Manitoba
January 1896 events